The 2021–22 season was the 115th season in the existence of Atlético Madrid and the club's 20th consecutive season in the top flight of Spanish football. In addition to the domestic league, Atlético Madrid participated in this season's editions of the Copa del Rey, the Supercopa de España, and the UEFA Champions League.

Kits

Players

First-team squad

Reserve team

Out on loan

Transfers

In

Out

Pre-season and friendlies

Competitions

Overall record

La Liga

League table

Results summary

Results by round

Matches
The league fixtures were announced on 30 June 2021.

Copa del Rey

Supercopa de España

UEFA Champions League

Group stage

The draw for the group stage was held on 26 August 2021.

Knockout phase

Round of 16
The draw for the round of 16 was held on 13 December 2021.

Quarter-finals
The draw for the quarter-finals was held on 18 March 2022.

Statistics

Squad statistics
As of match played 22 May 2022.

|-
! colspan="14" style="background:#dcdcdc; text-align:center"|Goalkeepers

|-
! colspan="14" style="background:#dcdcdc; text-align:center"|Defenders

|-
! colspan="14" style="background:#dcdcdc; text-align:center"|Midfielders

|-
! colspan="14" style="background:#dcdcdc; text-align:center"|Forwards

|-
! colspan=14 style=background:#dcdcdc; text-align:center|Players who have made an appearance this season but have left the club

|}

Goalscorers

Notes

References

Atlético Madrid seasons
Atlético Madrid
Atletico Madrid